Douglas P. Crane  (June 15, 1935 – December 17, 2020) was an American animator.

Life and career
Crane was born on June 15, 1935 in Bronxville, New York. He was one of eight kids in his family. "Often, it could be pretty tough trying to get my two cents into a conversation around the dinner table, It dawned on me that I could get my point across and also vent my frustrations by drawing pictures, usually of myself with my cartoon mouth wide open with balloon blurbs saying stuff like, 'Bobby, Shut Up!' or, 'Betty, Be Quiet!'", he said in a 2012 interview.

After graduating from Eastchester High School in Eastchester, New York, he got a job at Terrytoons in 1957, which was located at New Rochelle, New York. He married his wife, Maureen Hurley, at the time.

Crane took a break from animating during the beginning of his animation career and went to the United States Army in 1958. During his time with the army, he became a cartoonist and created a comic strip that ran in the military newspaper called Tiptoe and Timber. Other things he did while in the army include illustrating recruitment pamphlets, creating and painting floats for base parades, and painting signage for the White Sands Proving Grounds.

After returning from the army, he came back to Terrytoons and opened the Hanna-Barbera East Studios in New York City alongside Red Auguston at the request of Hanna-Barbera co-founder William Hanna. Crane then went on to animate for films, television series, television commercials, half-hour specials. He also drew comic strips and comic books.

Crane worked on Challenge of the Superfriends, The Smurfs, and Beavis and Butt-Head Do America, as well as one episode of the original television series, "Beavis and Butt-Head Are Dead".

He received a Clio Award and a National Television Commercials Award for his work on a Wall Street Journal commercial. He was also an animation professor at his alma mater, School of Visual Arts, formerly known as the Cartoonist and Illustrators School, where he taught classical animation (Professor of Classical Animation) for 15 years. Crane was also invited to teach at the Institute of Animation and Film at the Academy of Art and Design, Tsinghua University in Beijing, China.

Crane also spent time as the Artist In Residence at the Thornton-Donovan School in New Rochelle. He also served the Westchester County residents as an Auxiliary police officer, a Grand Knight at the New Rochelle Knights of Columbus, and as the Municipal Arts Commissioner where he planned and carried out the weekend-long 40th Anniversary celebration for Terrytoons in February 1982.

Crane died of cancer at age 85 on December 17, 2020, in Stuart, Florida.

Filmography

References

1935 births
2020 deaths
American comic strip cartoonists
Animators from New York (state)
Deaths from cancer in Florida
Eastchester High School alumni
Filmation people
Hanna-Barbera people
People from Bronxville, New York
Military personnel from New York (state)
School of Visual Arts alumni
Terrytoons people